Peace, Love & Light is the 15th studio release, second EP, and first digital-only album by Christian alternative rock band the Choir, released on November 27, 2013.  This is also the band's first Christmas-themed release. As a "stretch goal" in the Choir's Kickstarter campaign for their 2014 album Shadow Weaver, this EP was provided exclusively to funders who pledged $60 or more.

The five tracks are a mix of traditional carols, the Christmas standard "Baby, It's Cold Outside" and the title track, which is an original composition by Steve Hindalong and Derri Daugherty. The Apple Music version also includes "Babe in the Straw," a digital single that was originally released by the Choir in 2010.

Critical reception

Writing for Jesus Freak Hideout, Alex Caldwell praised the album, saying, "it's a testament to the quality offered here on Peace, Love and Light that five songs leave you wanting more," and added that, "another Christmas EP next year from these veterans would be a nice present indeed."

Track listing

Personnel 
The Choir
Derri Daugherty - guitars, vocals
Steve Hindalong - drums, percussion
Tim Chandler - bass
Dan Michaels - sax, lyricon
Marc Byrd - guitars

Guest performers
 Matt Slocum – Cello

Production
 Derri Daugherty - producer, recording and mixing
 Steve Hindalong - producer

References

2013 EPs
The Choir (alternative rock band) albums
Galaxy21 Music albums
2013 Christmas albums
Christmas albums by American artists
Alternative rock Christmas albums